Sirang Lupa, also known as Kabiserang Lupa, is a barangay in Calamba, Laguna, Philippines. It is situated adjacent to Canlubang. As of the 2020 census, Sirang Lupa had a population of 12,938.

Etymology 
The barangay of Sirang Lupa is bordered by the three barangays, Canlubang, Mayapa and Majada Out. Sirang Lupa is divided into two compounds, Kanluran (Dulo/Kanto) and the Silangan (Crossing Sirang Lupa). Sirang Lupa has four sitios: Sitio Major Homes, Sitio Pamintahan, Sitio Piano's and Sitio Tibagan.

Factories

Compounds
 Kanluran- (Mailom)
 Silangan- (Crossing-Sirang Lupa)

Sitios 
 Major Homes
 Pamintahan
 Piano's
 Tibagan

Resorts
 Sailaya Resort
 TORE Events and Resorts
 Villa San Jose

Population

References

External links
Official Website of the Provincial Government of Laguna

Barangays of Calamba, Laguna